Trelowia is a hamlet southeast of Widegates, Cornwall, England, United Kingdom.

Trelowia is in the parish of St Martin by Looe and the manor belongs to the Duchy of Cornwall.

References

Hamlets in Cornwall